Minuscule 186 (in the Gregory-Aland numbering), A129 (Soden), is a Greek minuscule manuscript of the New Testament, on parchment. Paleographically it has been assigned to the 11th century. It has marginalia.

Description 

The codex contains the text of the four Gospels on 36 thick parchment leaves (size ). The text is written in one column per page, biblical text in 20 lines per page (size of text 11.6 by 8.5 cm), text of commentary in 48 lines per page (size of commentary 21.9 by 15.8 cm), in brown ink, the capital letters in red.

There is also another division, according to the smaller Ammonian Sections (in Mark 233 Sections), with references to the Eusebian Canons (written below Ammonian Section numbers).

The commentary is of Victor's authorship in Mark.

Text 

The Greek text of the codex is a representative of the Byzantine text-type. Aland placed it in Category V.

It was not examined by using the Claremont Profile Method.

History 

The manuscript was written by Leontius, a calligrapher (see minuscule 208).

It was examined by Bandini, Birch, Scholz, and Burgon. C. R. Gregory saw the manuscript in 1886.

It is currently housed at the Laurentian Library (Plutei. VI. 18), at Florence.

See also 

 List of New Testament minuscules
 Biblical manuscript
 Textual criticism

References

Further reading 

 

Greek New Testament minuscules
11th-century biblical manuscripts